Charles Webb (1830 – 16 March 1917) was a Barbadian cricketer. He played in one first-class match for the Barbados cricket team in 1865/66.

See also
 List of Barbadian representative cricketers

References

External links
 

1830 births
1917 deaths
Barbadian cricketers
Barbados cricketers